Shushtari (also Romanized as Shūshtarī) is a village in Donbaleh Rud-e Shomali Rural District, Dehdez District, Izeh County, Khuzestan Province, Iran. At the 2006 census, its population was 20, in 4 families.

References 

Populated places in Izeh County